Gema Esther Zúñiga Pérez (born 31 March 1993) is a Nicaraguan footballer who plays as a defender for the Nicaragua women's national team.

Club career
Zúñiga has played for Deportivo KOL-8 in Nicaragua.

International career
Zúñiga capped for Nicaragua at senior level during two Central American and Caribbean Games editions (2010 and 2014).

References 

1993 births
Living people
Nicaraguan women's footballers
Women's association football defenders
Nicaragua women's international footballers